Farmer's Angle is an EP by Jim Jupp, under the pseudonym of Belbury Poly. It was released in 2004 on CD-R and was the first release on Ghost Box Records. In 2010, the EP was re-released and expanded on CD and 10" vinyl as Farmer's Angle' (Revised Edition), whilst it was re-issued in its original form in October 28, 2022 on CD and 7" vinyl.

Track listing

Track titles
Like another musical alias of Jupp, Eric Zann, Cool Air is named after a minor H. P. Lovecraft short story.

External links
Ghost Box Music page

Belbury Poly albums
Ghost Box Music EPs
2004 EPs